Season of Monsters is a 1987 Hungarian drama film written by Gyula Hernádi and directed by Miklós Jancsó.

The film was entered into the main competition at the 44th edition of the Venice Film Festival, and it got a Jury Honorable Mention "for the coherence with which he carries on and renews his expressive research in a period of rapid evolution of film language".

Plot
At a country house, a retiring teacher celebrates his birthday, where professors and students discuss Existentialism and philosophy. Then an unsettling play opens up a mystery.

Cast 
  
 József Madaras as Kamondi
 György Cserhalmi as Dr. Bardócz
 Ferenc Kállai  as Sándor Kovács
  Júlia Nyakó as Kati
 Katarzyna Figura  as  Annabella 
 András Bálint as Zoltán Zoltai
  Miklós B. Székely as The Deaf-mute
 András Kozák  as Colonel Antal
 Lajos Balázsovits  as Zimmermann

References

External links

1987 drama films
1987 films
Films directed by Miklós Jancsó
Hungarian drama films